De Gosto de Água e de Amigos is the eighth solo album by Brazilian musician Zé Ramalho. It was released in 1985. The Golden Boys, a famous Jovem Guarda band, made some guest appearances in several tracks of the album.

Track listing

Personnel 
 Zé Ramalho - Lead vocals, acoustic guitar
 Tavito - Acoustic guitar, vocalise and arrangements on track 10
 Jota Moraes - Keyboard, arrangements, conducting on tracks 1, 2, 3, 5, 7, 8
 Zé Américo - Keyboard, arrangements, conducting on tracks 4, 6, 9
 Eduardo Souto Neto - Keyboard
 Jaime Alem - Electric guitar on tracks 1, 2, 3, 5, 7, 8 steel guitar, acoustic guitar, arrangement and conducting on track 7
 Zepa - Electric guitar on tracks 4, 6, 9
 Fernando de Souza - Bass guitar on tracks 1, 2, 3, 5, 7, 8
 Sant'ana - Bass guitar on tracks 4, 6, 9
 Rui Motta - Drums on tracks 1, 2, 3, 5, 7, 8
 Helbert Bedaque - Drums on track 4, 6, 9
 Sidnei Moreira - Percussion on track 4, 8, 9
 Marcos Amma - Percussion on track 4, 8, 9
 João Firmino - Percussion on track 5
 Zé Gomes - Zabumba on track 4
 Niltinho - Trumpet on track 4
 Bidinho - Trumpet on track 4
 Roberto Marques - Trombone on track 4
 Pareschi - Spala on track 7
 Walter Hack - Violin on track 7
 Carlos Hack - Violin on track 7
 Paschoal Perrota - Violin on track 7
 Faini - Violin on track 7
 Aizik - Violin on track 7
 Michael Bessler - Violin on track 7
 Alves - Violin on track 7
 Stephany - Viola
 Penteado - Viola
 Jaques Morelembaum - Cello
 Alceu - Cello
 Marquinhos - Accordion on tracks 8, 9
 Zé Gomes - Rhythm
 Zé Leal - Rhythm
 João Gomes - Rhythm
 Ana Lúcia - Vocals on tracks 1, 2, 3, 5, 10
 Regina - Vocals on tracks 1, 2, 3, 5, 7, 9
 Renata Moraes - Vocals on tracks 1, 2, 3, 5, 7, 9
 Jurema - Vocals on tracks 1, 2, 3, 5, 7, 9
 Nair de Cândia - Vocals on tracks 1, 2, 3, 5, 7, 9
 Simiana - Vocals on track 10
 Marize - Vocals on track 10
 Fernando Adour - Vocals on track 10

References

1985 albums
Zé Ramalho albums
Epic Records albums